Charlie Morgan (born August 14, 1962, in Atlanta, Georgia) is a retired American soccer defender who played professionally in the Major Indoor Soccer League and the National Professional Soccer League.  He coached in the A-League and was a two time USISL Coach of the Year .

Player
In 1980, Morgan graduated from Southwest DeKalb High School.  His junior and senior season of college, he played for the University of Clemson.   His senior season, Morgan was captain of the Tigers as they captured the 1984 NCAA Division I Men's Soccer Championship.  In 1985, he signed with the Cleveland Force of the Major Indoor Soccer League.  On June 4, 1987, the Force released Morgan.  He then moved to the Atlanta Attack of the American Indoor Soccer Association.

Coach
In 1990, Morgan served as an assistant with the Clemson Tigers men's soccer team.  By 1993, he was coaching the Atlanta Magic in the USISL because he was the 1993–94 USISL indoor Coach of the Year.  Morgan received the award a second time a year later.  In 1995, the newly established Atlanta Ruckus hired Morgan as an assistant coach.  He moved up to head coach in 1996.  In 1997, he moved to the Richmond Kickers as the Director of Soccer Operations.  In 2004, Morgan became the head coach of the Frederica Academy boys' and girls' teams.  During the eight seasons he spent as coach, Morgan led Frederica Academy girls' team to six Georgia state high school soccer championship and the boys' team to five championships.

External links
 MISL: Charlie Morgan

References

Living people
1962 births
American soccer coaches
American soccer players
American Indoor Soccer Association players
Atlanta Attack players
Atlanta Silverbacks coaches
Clemson Tigers men's soccer players
Cleveland Force (original MISL) players
Major Indoor Soccer League (1978–1992) players
National Professional Soccer League (1984–2001) players
USISL coaches
Soccer players from Atlanta
Association football defenders